Charles E. Hanson was a member of the Wisconsin State Assembly.

Biography
Hanson was born on February 27, 1855, in Modum, Norway. In 1871, he settled in Pierce County, Wisconsin, where he eventually became a farm owner. On April 27, 1879, Hanson married Belle Anderson. They would have six children. Hanson was a member of the Methodist Episcopal Church. He died in 1932.

Political career
Hanson was elected to the Assembly in 1916, 1918, 1920, 1922 and 1928. During the 1925 session, Hanson was sergeant-at-arms of the Assembly. Other positions he held include Assessor of River Falls (town), Wisconsin and school board member. He was a Republican.

References

External links
RootsWeb

People from Modum
Norwegian emigrants to the United States
People from Pierce County, Wisconsin
Republican Party members of the Wisconsin State Assembly
School board members in Wisconsin
20th-century Methodists
Farmers from Wisconsin
1855 births
1932 deaths
Burials in Wisconsin
Leaders of the American Society of Equity